The 2008 season of 2. deild karla was the 43rd season of third-tier football in Iceland.

Standings

Top scorers

References
 RSSSF Page

2. deild karla seasons
Iceland
Iceland
3